Volodymyr Volodymyrovych Rafeienko (born November 25, 1969, in Donetsk) is a Ukrainian writer, novelist, and poet. From 1992 to 2018, he wrote his works in Russian, was mainly published in Russia and was considered a representative of Russian literature. He is the winner of the Russian Literary Prizes "Russian Prize" (2010, 2012) and "New Literature" (2014). In 2014, after moving to Kyiv, he studied Ukrainian. He later began writing his new novel in Ukrainian and became a full representative of Ukrainian literature. In 2019 he published his first novel in Ukrainian "Mondegreen (songs about death and love)."

References 

Living people
1969 births
Donetsk National University alumni 
Russian-language writers
Russian writers
Ukrainian writers
Ukrainian-language writers